Minerva Fighting Mars (Combat de Mars contre Minerve) is an oil-on-canvas painting created in 1771 by Jacques-Louis David and now in the Louvre.

History
David produced the painting to compete for the Prix de Rome of 1771. For the competition, he and the seven other participating artists were assigned the task of painting a new work in 10 weeks on a set subject, which that year was the Iliad. David's painting was awarded the second prize as the Prix de Rome was given to Joseph-Benoît Suvée. David believed that harsh criticism of his work by his teacher Joseph-Marie Vien had caused the prize to be awarded to an inferior painter, and became disgruntled with the academy, which he considered to be a dishonest institution. In 1774, David finally won the competition on his fourth attempt with Erasistratus Discovering the Cause of Antiochus' Disease.

References

Bibliography
Régis Michel and Marie-Catherine Sahut, David, l'art et le politique, Paris, Gallimard, coll. « Découvertes Gallimard » (n° 46), 1988

External links
Cartelfr.louvre.fr
Artliste.com

Mythological paintings by Jacques-Louis David
1771 paintings
Angels in art
Paintings in the Louvre by French artists
Paintings of Minerva
Paintings of Mars (mythology)